Stance is a 12" 45rpm e.p. (extended play) vinyl record by DIY home recording pioneer and one-man band R. Stevie Moore. The 3-track disc was issued by Moore's uncle Harry Palmer's H.P. Music of Verona NJ in September 1978. It contains Moore's songs and sound experiments from Nashville TN sessions, all originally recorded on 1/4 track 7 ips reel-to-reel stereo tape decks.

The front cover drawing was done by the artist.

Stance was included in its entirety as bonus tracks on the compact disc reissue of RSM's second album Delicate Tension in July 2004 by Alan Jenkins' private label Cordelia Records in the UK.

Track listing

 "Ist or Mas" (8:09) 4/76
 "Dance Man" (3:12) 6/77
 "Manufacturers" (4:36) 7/77

References

External links
 RSM's Stance webpage

1978 EPs
R. Stevie Moore albums
New Weird America albums